Motreb (meaning The Singer) is a 2019 Iranian comedy film directed, written, and produced by Mostafa Kiaie and starring Parviz Parastui, Elnaz Shakerdoost, Mehran Ahmadi, Ayşegül Coşkun, and Mohsen Kiaie. The film is about an Iranian nightclub singer, Ebrahim, who is forced to say goodbye to his lifelong dream of holding a concert in Iran because of the 1979 Islamic revolution. Pretending to be a folk vocalist, he is sent to Turkey to represent Iran in a musical festival, but Iranian officials discover that he is a prerevolution nightclub singer and prevent him from performing. He ultimately accomplishes to perform a concert in consort with his daughter-in-law, Nazan, who is a famous singer in Turkey.

Selling Rls.385,464,540,000, it is the highest-grossing Iranian movie as of 2021. The film screening was delayed because of the alleged  similarities between the protagonist of the film and Ebi, an Iranian dissident singer.

References

External links 
 

2019 comedy films
Iranian comedy-drama films
2010s Turkish-language films
Films about singers
2010s Persian-language films
Films shot in Turkey
Films set in Istanbul
2019 multilingual films
Iranian multilingual films